Empire Birch was a  tug built in 1941 for the Ministry of War Transport (MoWT). In 1942 she struck a mine and sank.

Description
Empire Birch was built by Henry Scarr Ltd, Hessle. She  was yard number 418 and was launched on 9 August 1941 with completion on 12 December. Her GRT was 245 with a NRT of 229.

Career
Empire Birch was operated by the MoWT, her port of registry was Hull. She was the lead ship of the Birch-class tugs. Although she was beached and abandoned, Empire Birch slid off the beach and sank in deep water.

Official Numbers and Code Letters

Official Numbers were a forerunner to IMO Numbers. Empire Bermuda had the UK Official Number 167111 and the Code Letters BCMV.

Propulsion

It was built by the O D Holmer & Co, Hull.

References

1941 ships
Ships built on the Humber
Tugboats of the United Kingdom
Ministry of War Transport ships
Empire ships
Steamships of the United Kingdom
Ships sunk by mines
Maritime incidents in August 1942